Sensitivity priority, often abbreviated Sv (for "sensitivity value") on a camera dial, and colloquially called "ISO priority", is a setting on Pentax cameras that allows the user to choose a specific Sensitivity (ISO speed) value while the camera selects a shutter speed and aperture to match.  The camera will ensure proper exposure.  This is different from manual mode, where the user must decide all three values, shutter priority where the user picks a shutter speed with the camera selecting the aperture to match, or program mode where the camera selects all three.

On other cameras, such as those from Canon and Nikon, this is not a distinguished mode. Rather, ISO can be set manually in all modes, or (sometimes) set to auto, and thus sensitivity priority is equivalent to manual ISO and program mode, in both cases automatically selecting aperture and shutter speed, with a manual ISO setting.

See also
Reasons for using:
 Exposure (photography)
 Depth of field
Other 'modes:'
 Shutter priority
 Aperture priority
 Mode dial

Camera features